Fanny Holland (14 September 1847 – 18 June 1931) was an English singer and comic actress primarily known as the creator of principal soprano roles in numerous German Reed Entertainments.

Life and career
Holland was born in London and trained at the Royal Academy of Music.  She was the daughter of John Holland and his wife Meriel Ann nee Marshall.

For several years, she was a popular concert singer in London and the British provinces.  Frederic Clay engaged her for a part in an operetta he had written.  It was performed in Canterbury and included a song for Holland that she popularised, "She Wandered Down the Mountain Side."  Soon after that experience, Holland made her London stage debut with the German Reed Entertainments at the Gallery of Illustration, in November 1869, as Rose in W. S. Gilbert and Clay's Ages Ago.  Holland eventually appeared in scores of German Reed productions.  They included four more of Gilbert's German Reed pieces: Our Island Home (1870), A Sensation Novel (1871), Happy Arcadia (1872), and Eyes and No Eyes (1875).  She also starred in Dora's Dream, with music by Alfred Cellier and words by Arthur Cecil (1873).  Holland also appeared in Gilbert's Topsyturveydom at the Criterion Theatre in 1874.

Holland returned to the German Reeds in 1875.  In 1877, she married actor-playwright Arthur Law, with whom she appeared with the German Reeds.  The couple had a son named Hamilton Patrick John Holland Law (born 1879).  During a two-year period, from 1879 to 1881, Law and Holland performed on tour as "Mr. & Mrs. Arthur Law's Entertainment," but the venture proved unsuccessful.  Holland then remained with the German Reeds at their new theatre, St. George's Hall, until 1895, except when she performed with the D'Oyly Carte Opera Company at the Opera Comique, as Josephine in H.M.S. Pinafore from December 1879 through February 1880, at the close of the run.

At St. George's she played in entertainments too numerous to list.  In 1877 alone, she appeared in A Night Surprise by her husband, Arthur Law, writing under the pseudonym, "West Cromer"; Number 204 by F. C. Burnand, with music by Mr. German Reed; A Happy Bungalow, by Law, with music by King Hall; Once in a Century by Gilbert Arthur à Beckett, with music by Vivian Bligh; and Our New Doll’s House by W. Wye, with music by Cotsford Dick.  Her fellow players, besides the German Reeds, and their son Alfred, included Law, Cecil, Corney Grain, Leonora Braham and Carlotta Carrington.  Among many other works by her husband, she played in his 1882 play Nobody's Fault.

In 1895, the German Reed partnership dissolved, following the deaths of Corney Grain and Alfred German Reed.  One of Holland's last appearances at St. George's Hall was in an 1895 revival of Happy Arcadia, under the management of Rutland Barrington.  She later appeared in Henry Arthur Jones's comedy The Manoeuvers of Jane at the Haymarket Theatre in 1898-99.

Holland died in Bournemouth at the age of 83.

Notes

References
Gänzl, Kurt.  The British Musical Theatre, Macmillan, vol.I, London, 1986.

External links
Fanny Holland at Who Was Who in the D'Oyly Carte
www.gabrielleray.150m.com/ArchivePressText2003/20030426.html Information about, and review of, Holland

English operatic sopranos
English stage actresses
People associated with Gilbert and Sullivan
1847 births
1931 deaths
19th-century British women opera singers